Zariņš (feminine: Zariņa) is a Latvian language surname, derived from the Latvian word for "branch" or "twig" (zars). Individuals with the surname include:

Christopher Zariņš (born 1943), Latvian-American surgeon
Ivars Zariņš (born 1969), Latvian politician
Juris Zarins (born 1945), American archaeologist
Kārlis Zariņš (writer) (1889–1978), Latvian writer
Kārlis Reinholds Zariņš (1879–1963), Latvian diplomat
Marģeris Zariņš (1910–1993), Latvian composer and writer
Rihards Zariņš (1869–1939), Latvian graphic artist

See also 
Zarin (disambiguation)

References

Latvian-language masculine surnames